"Missing You Now" is a song by American singer-songwriter Michael Bolton. It was the fourth single released from his 1991 album, Time, Love & Tenderness, and features saxophone player Kenny G. The track was co-produced by Walter Afanasieff, who co-wrote the song with Bolton and Diane Warren.

"Missing You Now" entered the top 20 of the US Billboard Hot 100 chart, peaking at  12 in March 1992, and reached No. 1 on the Adult Contemporary Chart for three weeks, Bolton's sixth song to do so and Kenny G's first. The song also reached No. 28 on the UK Singles Chart, No. 27 on the Irish Singles Chart, and topped the Canadian RPM Adult Contemporary chart. The music video for "Missing You Now" features actress Teri Hatcher, whom Bolton was reportedly dating at the time.

Personnel
 Michael Bolton: lead vocals, songwriter, producer, arranger
 Diane Warren: songwriter
 Walter Afanasieff: songwriter, producer, arranger, keyboards, Moog bass, synthesizer, drums, percussion
 Louis Biancaniello: additional keyboards, drum programming
 Ren Klyce: Akai AX60, Fairlight CMI, and Synclavier programming
 Kenny G: soprano saxophone
 Michael Landau: guitars
 Claytoven Richardson, Jeanie Tracy, Kitty Beethoven, Sandy Griffith, Vicki Randle: background vocals

Charts

Weekly charts

Year-end charts

Release history

References

1990 songs
1991 singles
Columbia Records singles
Kenny G songs
Michael Bolton songs
Song recordings produced by Walter Afanasieff
Songs written by Diane Warren
Songs written by Michael Bolton
Songs written by Walter Afanasieff